Villastar is a municipality located in the province of Teruel, Aragon, Spain.

References

Municipalities in the Province of Teruel